The Eleven Schill Officers is a 1926 German silent historical film directed by Rudolf Meinert and starring Meinert, Gustav Adolf Semler, Grete Reinwald, and Leopold von Ledebur.  The film depicts the failed 1809 uprising of Prussian soldiers led by Ferdinand von Schill against the occupying French during the Napoleonic War. The film received poor reviews from critics, but earned enough at the box office to offset its production costs.

According to IMDB, it was released in the USA as "Eleven Who Were Loyal" in 1929. A NY Times review which also covers several other movies of that same date is available online dated from May 20, 1929.

It was part of the cycle of Prussian films. The film was remade by Meinert as a sound film The Eleven Schill Officers in 1932 with Carl de Vogt cast as Schill.

Cast

References

Bibliography

External links

1926 films
Films of the Weimar Republic
German historical films
German war drama films
German silent feature films
Films directed by Rudolf Meinert
Films set in the 1800s
Napoleonic Wars films
War films based on actual events
Prussian films
1920s historical films
German black-and-white films
Films set in Prussia
Silent drama films
Silent war films
1920s German films